David Blount (born July 19, 1967) is a Democratic member of the Mississippi Senate, representing the 29th District since 2008.  His present term of office will end in 2024. He is Vice Chairman of the Senate Democratic Caucus.

Prior to being a state senator, he was employed at the office of the Secretary of State of Mississippi under Eric Clark, the Secretary of State. In 2007, he defeated two other Democratic opponents to win the Democratic nomination for Senate seat #29 in Hinds County.  He went on to defeat the incumbent senator, Richard White. Blount was re-elected in 2011 with 69 percent of the vote over a Republican opponent, and again in 2015 with 79 percent of the vote.  He was re-elected in 2019.

References

External links
Mississippi State Senate - David Blount official government website
Project Vote Smart - Senator David Blount (MS) profile
Follow the Money - David Blount
2007 campaign contributions

Democratic Party Mississippi state senators
1967 births
Living people
Politicians from Jackson, Mississippi
Davidson College alumni
University of Virginia alumni
21st-century American politicians